Polyptychus baxteri is a moth of the family Sphingidae. It is known from eastern and western Africa.

The length of the forewings is 26 mm for males, females are somewhat larger. The body and forewings are greyish purple. There is a dark median streak on the head and thorax and a dark streak from the costa (near the base) to the tornus, widening at the tornus. The hindwings are pinker, specially near the base. The inner marginal streak and tornal spots are variable and sometimes almost absent.

The larvae feed on Thespesia species.

Subspecies
Polyptychus baxteri baxteri (Braehystegia savanna and woodland in Tanzania and Zambia)
Polyptychus baxteri jansei Clark, 1936 (Zimbabwe and western Mozambique)

References

Polyptychus
Moths described in 1908
Moths of Sub-Saharan Africa
Lepidoptera of Mozambique
Lepidoptera of Tanzania
Lepidoptera of Zambia
Lepidoptera of Zimbabwe